William Gordon Bonham (born October 1, 1948) is a retired former pitcher for the Chicago Cubs (1971–77) and Cincinnati Reds (1978–80). He played for the UCLA Bruins and was a member of the 1969 College World Series team with Chris Chambliss.

He helped the Reds win the 1979 National League Western Division.

Bonham led the National League in losses (22) in 1974.

On July 31, 1974, Bonham tied a Major League record (shared by 49 pitchers) by striking out four batters in an inning (2nd).

He also led the National League in earned runs allowed (120) in 1975.

In 10 years he had a 75–83 win–loss record and had 300 games, 214 games started, 27 complete games, 4 shutouts, 33 games finished, 11 saves,  innings pitched, 1,512 hits allowed, 743 runs allowed, 662 earned runs allowed, 98 home runs allowed, 636 walks allowed, 985 strikeouts, 35 hit batsmen, 68 wild pitches, 6,484 batters faced, 57 intentional walks, 19 balks and a 4.01 ERA.

See also
 List of Major League Baseball single-inning strikeout leaders

References

External links

1948 births
Living people
Baseball players from California
Major League Baseball pitchers
Chicago Cubs players
Cincinnati Reds players
Indianapolis Indians players
Huron Cubs players
Tacoma Cubs players
Tampa Tarpons (1957–1987) players
Wichita Aeros players
UCLA Bruins baseball players
Los Angeles Valley Monarchs baseball players
Sportspeople from Glendale, California